The Catered Affair (also known as Wedding Party) is a 1956 American comedy-drama film  directed by Richard Brooks and produced by Sam Zimbalist from a screenplay by Gore Vidal, based on a 1955 television play by Paddy Chayefsky. The film stars Bette Davis, Ernest Borgnine, Debbie Reynolds, Barry Fitzgerald and Rod Taylor. It was Taylor's first film for Metro-Goldwyn-Mayer after signing a long-term contract with the studio. The film score was by André Previn and the cinematographer was John Alton.

Plot
Agnes Hurley (Davis) is a disillusioned housewife, married to Bronx cab driver Tom Hurley (Borgnine). She wants something better for her daughter, Jane (Reynolds). When Jane announces her engagement to Ralph Halloran (Taylor), Aggie sees this as an opportunity to have a romantic elaborate wedding, with caterers and all the trimmings, like she never had because they could never afford it. However, the daughter does not want it because it is causing awkward conflicts with her family and friends, and her father has been saving that money for many years to purchase a taxi medallion and become self-employed. The film deals with the ensuing money troubles and conflicts within the family, which also involve Uncle Jack Conlon (Fitzgerald) and most of the neighborhood. It is not until the end of the film that the mother realizes that it is the happiness of her family, rather than the expensive ceremony, that is most important, as they go off to watch their daughter get married at their church in the new taxi.

Cast
 Bette Davis as Agnes Hurley 
 Ernest Borgnine as Tom Hurley 
 Debbie Reynolds as Jane Hurley 
 Barry Fitzgerald as Uncle Jack Conlon 
 Rod Taylor as Ralph Halloran 
 Robert Simon as Mr. Halloran 
 Madge Kennedy as Mrs. Halloran 
 Dorothy Stickney as Mrs. Rafferty 
 Carol Veazie as Mrs. Casey 
 Joan Camden as Alice Scanlon
 Ray Stricklyn as Eddie Hurley 
 Jay Adler as Sam Leiter

Production
MGM bought the screen rights in 1955. Ann Blyth was originally announced for the female lead.

Debbie Reynolds later said she "hated making" the film "for personal reasons. I like the result and he directed me well but the director made it difficult for me and gave me a hard time."

"He called me ‘Little Miss Hollywood’ and made no attempt to hide his disdain for me. Every day he was rude, and once he slapped me across the face in front of everyone. I don't know what I'd done to anger him that time. I was always professional."

Reception
According to MGM records, the film earned $947,000 in the U.S. and Canada and $520,000 in other countries, resulting in a loss of $106,000. Critics' reviews were unfavorable, with the film currently holding a 17% on Rotten Tomatoes.

Stage musical
A musical adaptation also titled A Catered Affair, with book by Harvey Fierstein and lyrics and music by John Bucchino, premiered at San Diego's Old Globe Theatre in 2007 and the following year played on Broadway at the Walter Kerr Theatre.  The cast included Faith Prince, Tom Wopat, Leslie Kritzer and Fierstein.

See also
 List of American films of 1956

References

External links
 
 
 
 
 

1956 films
1956 comedy-drama films
American black-and-white films
American comedy-drama films
1950s English-language films
Films scored by André Previn
Films about weddings
Films based on television plays
Films directed by Richard Brooks
Films set in the Bronx
Metro-Goldwyn-Mayer films
Plays by Paddy Chayefsky
Films with screenplays by Gore Vidal
1956 comedy films
1956 drama films
1950s American films